The Swiss Handball League (SHL) is the name of the professional handball league of Switzerland. It is divided into two divisions:
 Nationalliga A 
 Nationalliga B

Current season

Teams for season 2020–21

Pfadi Winterthur
Kadetten Schaffhausen
HC Kriens-Luzern
HSC Suhr Aarau
Wacker Thun
BSV Bern
RTV 1879 Basel
TSV St. Otmar St. Gallen
GC Amicitia Zürich
TV Endingen

2016/17 Season

Nationalliga A
 BSV Bern
 HC Kriens-Luzern
 HSC Suhr Aarau
 Kadetten Schaffhausen
 Pfadi Winterthur
 RTV 1879 Basel
 GC Amicitia Zürich
 TSV Fortitudo Gossau
 TSV St. Otmar St. Gallen
 Wacker Thun

Nationalliga B 
 CS Chênois Genève 
 HC KTV Altdorf
 HC Wädenswil
 HSG Siggenthal
 Lakers Stäfa
 SG Horgen
 SG TV Solothurn
 Pfadi Espoirs
 STV Baden
 Kadetten Schaffhausen II 
 TV Endingen
 TV Möhlin
 TV Steffisburg

Nationalliga A Champions

 1950 : Grasshopper Club Zürich
 1951 : Grasshopper Club Zürich (2)
 1952 : Grasshopper Club Zürich (3)
 1953 : STV Rorschach
 1954 : Grasshopper Club Zürich (4)
 1955 : Grasshopper Club Zürich (5)
 1956 : Grasshopper Club Zürich (6)
 1957 : Grasshopper Club Zürich (7)
 1958 : BTV St. Gallen
 1959 : BTV St. Gallen (2)
 1960 : RTV 1879 Basel
 1961 : BSV Bern
 1962 : Grasshopper Club Zürich (8)
 1963 : Grasshopper Club Zürich (9)
 1964 : Grasshopper Club Zürich (10)
 1965 : Grasshopper Club Zürich (11)
 1966 : Grasshopper Club Zürich (12)
 1967 : ATV Basel-Stadt
 1968 : Grasshopper Club Zürich (13)
 1969 : Grasshopper Club Zürich (14)
 1970 : Grasshopper Club Zürich (15)
 1971 : TSV St. Otmar St. Gallen
 1972 : ATV Basel-Stadt (2)
 1973 : TSV St. Otmar St. Gallen (2)
 1974 : TSV St. Otmar St. Gallen (3)
 1975 : Grasshopper Club Zürich (16)
 1976 : Grasshopper Club Zürich (17)
 1977 : Grasshopper Club Zürich (18)
 1978 : TV Zofingen
 1979 : Grasshopper Club Zürich (19)
 1980 : BSV Bern (2)
 1981 : TSV St. Otmar St. Gallen (4)
 1982 : TSV St. Otmar St. Gallen (5)
 1983 : TV Zofingen (2)
 1984 : RTV 1879 Basel (2)
 1985 : BSV Bern (3)
 1986 : TSV St. Otmar St. Gallen (6)
 1987 : ZMC Amicitia Zürich
 1988 : ZMC Amicitia Zürich (2)
 1989 : ZMC Amicitia Zürich (3)
 1990 : Grasshopper Club Zürich (20)
 1991 : Grasshopper Club Zürich (21)
 1992 : Pfadi Winterthur
 1993 : BSV Borba Luzern
 1994 : Pfadi Winterthur (2)
 1995 : Pfadi Winterthur (3)
 1996 : Pfadi Winterthur (4)
 1997 : Pfadi Winterthur (5)
 1998 : Pfadi Winterthur (6)
 1999 : TV Suhr
 2000 : TV Suhr (2)
 2001 : TSV St. Otmar St. Gallen (7)
 2002 : Pfadi Winterthur (7)
 2003 : Pfadi Winterthur (8)
 2004 : Pfadi Winterthur (9)
 2005 : Kadetten Schaffhausen
 2006 : Kadetten Schaffhausen (2)
 2007 : Kadetten Schaffhausen (3)
 2008 : ZMC Amicitia Zürich (4)
 2009 : ZMC Amicitia Zürich (5)
 2010 : Kadetten Schaffhausen (4)
 2011 : Kadetten Schaffhausen (5)
 2012: Kadetten Schaffhausen (6)
 2013 : Wacker Thun
 2014 : Kadetten Schaffhausen (7)
 2015 : Kadetten Schaffhausen (8)
 2016 : Kadetten Schaffhausen (9)
 2017 : Kadetten Schaffhausen (10)
 2018 : Wacker Thun (2)
 2019 : Kadetten Schaffhausen (11)
 2020 : No champion due to the Covid-19 pandemic
 2021 : Pfadi Winterthur (10)
 2022 : Kadetten Schaffhausen (12)

EHF coefficient ranking
For season 2015/2016, see footnote

9.  (14)  Elitserien (36.33)
10.  (12)  Chempiyanat 1 (33.90)
11.  (8)  Swiss Handball League (33.00)
12.  (13)  Liga Națională (32.80)
13.  (9)  Premier League of Croatia (32.11)

See also
SPAR Premium League

References

External links
 www.handball.ch

Handball leagues in Switzerland
Swiss League
Switzerland
Professional sports leagues in Switzerland